The Pig Tail Bridge is a bridge in Custer County, South Dakota, United States, which was built around 1930. Located in Wind Cave National Park,  it is a spiral bridge.  It was listed on the National Register of Historic Places in 1995.

The Pig Tail Bridge was built to develop South Dakota Highway 87 in which it is part of.

References

Bridges completed in 1930
National Register of Historic Places in Custer County, South Dakota
National Register of Historic Places in Wind Cave National Park
Road bridges on the National Register of Historic Places in South Dakota
Spiral bridges